Tabernaemontana eglandulosa is a species of plant in the family Apocynaceae. It is found in Benin to Angola.

References

eglandulosa